Elisabeth Brooke Harrington, born 1968, is an American academic and author, and professor of economic sociology at Dartmouth College.

Early life
In 1990, Harrington earned a bachelor's degree in English literature from Stanford University. In 1996, Harrington earned a master's degree in sociology, from Harvard University. In 1999, Harrington earned a PhD degree in sociology, from Harvard University.

Career
From 1999 to 2007, Harrington was Assistant Professor of Sociology and Public Policy at Brown University. From 2006 to 2009, she was a research fellow at the Max Planck Institute for the Study of Societies in Cologne. She was a professor of economic sociology at the Copenhagen Business School, 2010–2018. In 2017, she faced legal difficulties with the authorities in Denmark about a visa dispute, even though she had been invited to speak as a guest lecturer to the Danish Parliament; the dispute ended eight months later when Denmark changed its laws. She is an advocate against xenophobia and for the benefits of immigration. In January 2019, she became a Professor of Sociology at Dartmouth College in Hanover, New Hampshire.

Works
 Harrington, Brooke (1999). Dollars for Difference: The "Diversity Premium" in Investing Organizations. Harvard University, ProQuest Dissertations Publishing
 Harrington, Brooke (2007). Capital and Community: Findings from the American Investment Craze of the 1990s. Economic Sociology: The European Electronic Newsletter, 8(3), 19-25.

References

External links
 BrookeHarrington.com
 works at bepress
 Brooke Harrington -  Albright Institute, Wellesley College
 Brooke Harrington - The Atlantic
 Brooke Harrington - The Guardian
 Elisabeth Brooke Harrington Department of Sociology, Faculty of Arts and Sciences, Harvard University

Living people
Academic staff of Copenhagen Business School
Stanford University alumni
Harvard University alumni
Brown University faculty
American sociologists
American women sociologists
Economic sociologists
21st-century American women
1968 births